Osman Sarwar Alam Chowdhury was a Bangladesh Awami League politician, diplomat, and the former Member of Parliament from Cox's Bazar-3.

Early life
Chowdhury completed a M.A. in international relations at the University of Dhaka. He was also involved with student politics.

Career
Chowdhury served in the Constituent Assembly of Bangladesh and is a signatory to the framing of the constitution in 1972. In 1973, he led the first Bangladeshi delegation to Saudi Arabia for the Hajj. In 1996, he joined the foreign service of Bangladesh. In 1996 he was appointed the Bangladesh Ambassador to the UAE, where he served till 2001.

Death
Chowdhury died in August 2010.

References

Awami League politicians
2010 deaths
University of Dhaka alumni
Ambassadors of Bangladesh to the United Arab Emirates
Dhaka College alumni